Jacques Blanc (born 21 October 1939) is a French politician and former senator for the Lozère department. He is also mayor of La Canourgue and president of the Aubrac-Lot-Causse communauté de communes. He is a member of the Union for a Popular Movement (UMP).

Blanc was president of the Languedoc-Roussillon Region from 1986 to 2004. His final mandate proved controversial, as the Socialist Party won more seats (although short of an absolute majority) in the 1998 elections for the regional council than Blanc's RPR list: Blanc had to rely on the votes of the far-right National Front councillors to remain president.

Blanc was also député for the 2nd district of Lozère (the western part of the department) in the National Assembly from 2 April 1973 until his elevation to the Senate on 1 October 2001, except for the period 29 March 1977 – 31 March 1978 when he served in Raymond Barre's government as Secretary of State for Agriculture. On 25 September 2011, he lost the senatorial reelection (he was elected in 2001). Alain Bertrand, the leftist Mayor of Mende, Lozère, was elected in his place.

References

External links
Page on the Senate website
Page on the National Assembly website

1939 births
Living people
People from Rodez
Independent Republicans politicians
Republican Party (France) politicians
Liberal Democracy (France) politicians
Union for French Democracy politicians
Union for a Popular Movement politicians
French Senators of the Fifth Republic
Recipients of the Olympic Order
Senators of Lozère
Presidents of the European Committee of the Regions